Tim Grant (born 17 February 1988) is an Australian professional rugby league footballer who plays as a . 

He previously played for the  Penrith Panthers in two separate spells, and the South Sydney Rabbitohs and the Wests Tigers in the NRL. Grant has played for City Origin, Prime Minister's XIII, New South Wales in the State of Origin series and the NRL All Stars.

Background
Grant was born in Penrith, New South Wales, Australia.

Playing career
Grant started his NRL career in 2007. He made his representative début for the City New South Wales team in the 2011 City vs Country Origin match.

Grant was selected to make his début for the New South Wales Blues in the 2012 State of Origin series' second game. He took the first hit-up of the match and was seen as contributing well to the Blues's victory.

Early in the 2014 NRL season Grant was relegated to the New South Wales Cup and was informed by Penrith to find a new club, despite having two years left on his contract. Although the club later changed its tune, Grant finalised a move to the South Sydney Rabbitohs in April 2014, signing a 4-year contract.

On 8 January 2016, Grant signed a 2-year contract with the Wests Tigers starting effective immediately, after being granted a release from the final 3 years of his South Sydney contract.

At the end of the 2018 NRL season, Grant was released by Wests.  Grant then signed a contract to return to his former club Penrith for the 2019 NRL season.  In Round 12 2019 against Manly-Warringah, Grant was taken from the field with an injury which was later revealed to be a torn pectoral muscle and was ruled out for the season.  On 5 June 2019, Grant informed the Penrith club of his decision to terminate his contract.

On 14 November 2019, it was announced that Grant had signed a contract to join the Thirroul Butchers in the local Illawarra competition for 2020.

References

External links

Penrith Panthers profile
NRL profile
South Sydney Rabbitohs profile

1988 births
Living people
Australian rugby league players
New South Wales City Origin rugby league team players
Prime Minister's XIII players
New South Wales Rugby League State of Origin players
NRL All Stars players
Penrith Panthers players
North Sydney Bears NSW Cup players
Rugby league players from Penrith, New South Wales
Rugby league props
South Sydney Rabbitohs players
Wests Tigers players
Western Suburbs Magpies NSW Cup players
Windsor Wolves players